Antioch Community High School, Antioch, or ACHS, is a public four-year high school located in Antioch, Illinois, a far north suburb of Chicago, Illinois, in the United States. It is part of Community High School District 117, which also includes Lakes Community High School, a school that opened its doors and formed the district in 2004.

History
ACHS was built in 1915 at 1133 Main Street, where it has remained since then. Though the original building was renovated in the late 1990s to make room for new facilities, it has undergone numerous additions and a name change throughout its history. ACHS was originally named Antioch Township High School when it was founded in 1915. In February 1926, voters approved $65,000 to build a two-story north wing to the existing high school, which served 184 students at the time. In 1953, the school was improved once again with the addition of a new wing expanding the school further north. The old gym was converted into an auditorium large enough to hold the 382 students enrolled at the time, and a new gym was added, in addition to new classrooms and office space. In November 1962, an addition was made to the west of the school. Science labs, a cafeteria, classrooms, and a library blocked the view of the original Antioch Township High School which was renamed Antioch Community High School the following year. In 1972, additions were needed again to house the 1,377 students enrolled. Additions to the north wing added drivers ed. and fine arts facilities, a new gym, lockers, 24 classrooms, and a commons area. But only 26 years later, the school underwent a major renovation to accommodate the population growth in the 1990s. The original building was razed in 1998 to pave the way for extensive remodeling and new additions. A third gymnasium was built in 2004. More than $16 million in renovations have been made since 2003.

The current ACHS logo was created in the early 1970s by John O'Hara for the football squad. Other sports teams soon adopted the logo as their own, and before long the image was used as a school-wide symbol. According to the ACHS website: "The "A" in the center stands for Antioch (naturally) and the circle surrounding it represents the unity of the students and athletes who wear the symbol. The arrow always faces forward, symbolizing the need to move ahead and overcome obstacles. Two feathers below the arrow represent teamwork and working together to achieve success."

There is no Native American tribe named "Sequoit" (pronounced see-kwoit) or any Native American word for that matter. Though the word "sequoit" has Native American origins, the story behind the name is a complicated and confusing one. Fred Willman explained in his in-depth book examining Illinois high school nicknames, "Why Mascots Have Tales", "The word Sequoit is a form of spelling of the Iroquois Indian word Sa-da-quoit, which was the name the Iroquois Indians gave to a stream that flows through Oneida County in New York state. In the Iroquois language, Sa-da-quoit literally means 'smooth pebbles in the bed of a stream.' When white settlers moved into Oneida County, they modified the spelling and pronunciation of the stream to Sauquoit Creek."

Antioch's first settlers, Darius and Thomas Gage, traveled west from the Oneida County and named the stream that ran past their land "Sequoit Creek" because it reminded them of Sauquoit Creek back home. Many local businesses, and ACHS sports teams, used "sequoit" in their names. In its early years, students would dress in Native American apparel and perform during half-time, but over time the performances died out. The Sequoit logo and spirit have remained intact throughout the ages, even though similar Native American inspired team names and mascots have been changed.

Athletics
Boys sports include baseball, basketball, cross country, football, golf, lacrosse, soccer, swimming, tennis, track, volleyball, and wrestling. Girls sports include basketball, bowling, cheerleading, cross country, dance, field hockey, golf, gymnastics, soccer, softball, tennis, track, and volleyball.

Academics
Antioch's 2015 ACT composite score is 21.9, its graduation rate is 95 percent with 89 percent of seniors listed as college bound, and the attendance rate is 93.2 percent. The average class size is 18.7 and the pupil-to-teacher ratio is 17 to 1. The staff's average teaching experience is 12.7 years. Antioch has made Adequate Yearly Progress on the Prairie State Achievement Examination, a state test part of the No Child Left Behind Act, as of August 2007.

Notable alumni

Dale Barnstable (Class of 1946), basketball player for the University of Kentucky and figure in the 1950s college basketball point shaving scandal.
Eric Eckenstahler (Class of 1995) former Major League Baseball pitcher, played for the Detroit Tigers
James Grippando (Class of 1976) is a New York Times Bestselling Author of 25 novels published worldwide in 28 languages.
John Thain (Class of 1977) was the last chairman and CEO of Merrill Lynch before its distressed merger with Bank of America.
Anthony Starke (Class of 1981) is an actor, having appeared on many television series including Nip/Tuck and Prison Break.
Paul DeJong (Class of 2011) is a Major League Baseball player for the St. Louis Cardinals in May 2017; his first MLB at-bat resulted in a home run.

References

External links
 Official website

Public high schools in Illinois
Educational institutions established in 1915
Antioch, Illinois
Schools in Lake County, Illinois
1915 establishments in Illinois